ADNI is a private Islamic school in Ampang, Selangor, Malaysia. It was established in 1994 and currently has over 800 students and 100 teachers from all around the world.  The school prepares students for the international curriculum (IGCSE) as well as the national curriculum (SPM) based on student choice.

Adni Islamic School was set up in 1994 to provide an integrated Islamic programme for children from pre-school to secondary level. It is registered with the Malaysian Ministry of Education.

Adni's history

More about Adni
About ADNI https://www.youtube.com/watch?v=ORSyIOEHeok
https://www.youtube.com/watch?v=-tW9gjwhIaI

Secondary schools in Selangor
Educational institutions established in 1998
19th-century establishments in Malaysia
Islamic schools in Malaysia
Cambridge schools in Malaysia
Educational institutions in Malaysia